Valupey Rural District (Velopi use in local pronunciation) is a rural district (dehestan) in the Central District of Savadkuh County, Mazandaran Province, Iran. At the 2006 census, its population was 3,538, in 1,097 families. The rural district has 37 villages.

References 

Rural Districts of Mazandaran Province
Savadkuh County